The Bridewell was a prison in Edinburgh, Scotland, built by Robert Adam in 1791.

The remains of the prison can still be seen built into the bottom part of the Scottish Government building on Regent Road.

References

Defunct prisons in Edinburgh
1791 establishments in Scotland
Buildings and structures completed in 1791